The anterior inferior iliac spine (AIIS) is a bony eminence on the anterior border of the hip bone, or, more precisely, the wing of the ilium.

Structure 
The AIIS is a bony eminence on the anterior border of the ilium. It is below the anterior superior iliac spine.

Development 
The AIIS is formed from a separate ossification centre to the rest of the ilium.

Function 
The upper portion of the spine gives origin to the straight head of the rectus femoris muscle. A teardrop-shaped lower portion gives origin to the iliofemoral ligament of the hip joint and borders the rim of the acetabulum.

Anteromedially and inferiorly to the AIIS is the iliopsoas groove, the passage for the iliopsoas muscle as it passes down to the lesser trochanter of the femur. A vague line, the inferior gluteal line, might run from the AIIS to the greater sciatic notch which delineates the inferior extent of the origin of gluteus minimus muscle.

Clinical significance 
Rectus femoris muscle may avulse from the AIIS with significant mechanical stress. This may be surgically reattached.

Additional images

Notes 

Bones of the pelvis
Ilium (bone)